Rasbora vietnamensis is a species of ray-finned fish in the genus Rasbora which is endemic to Phú Quốc Island in Vietnam.

References

Rasboras
Fish described in 2013
Fish of Vietnam